On November 27 and 28, 2005, a substantial outbreak of tornadoes occurred in the Central United States. It was the fourth and final major outbreak of the unusually active month; the other three occurring on November 6, 12 and 15. In addition, the same system produced a major blizzard in the northern and western Great Plains. Overall, the outbreak resulted in two fatalities, one in Missouri and the other in Arkansas.

Confirmed tornadoes

November 27 event

November 28 event

See also
 List of tornadoes and tornado outbreaks

References

External links
 Nov 27 Preliminary storm reports via Storm Prediction Center
 Nov 28 Preliminary storm reports via Storm Prediction Center

2005 meteorology
Tornadoes in Alabama
Tornadoes in Arkansas
Tornadoes in Kansas
Tornadoes in Missouri
Tornadoes in Mississippi
Tornadoes in Louisiana
Tornadoes of 2005
F3 tornadoes
November 2005 events in the United States